WSFQ (96.3 FM, "The Rock 96.3 WSFQ") is a radio station broadcasting a classic rock music format. Licensed to Peshtigo, Wisconsin, United States, the station is currently owned by Radio Plus Bay Cities, LLC.

History
The station was assigned the call letters WHYB on October 31, 1989. On July 15, 1992, the station changed its call sign to WJMR and then on June 7, 1996, to the current WSFQ.

In January 2009, WSFQ changed from classic rock as "Rock 96" to a "best of the '70s and '80s" format as "Hits 96.3." Prior to the classic rock format, WSFQ had played oldies under the "Q96" moniker. The station later evolved into an adult contemporary format by adding more current and recent hits into rotation.

On January 2, 2020, WSFQ changed their format back to classic rock, branded as "The Rock 96.3 WSFQ".

References

External links
Official Website

SFQ
Radio stations established in 1996
1996 establishments in Wisconsin
Classic rock radio stations in the United States